Lethality (also called deadliness or perniciousness) is how capable something is of causing death. Most often it is used when referring to diseases, chemical weapons, biological weapons, or their toxic chemical components.  The use of this term denotes the ability of these weapons to kill, but also the possibility that they may not kill.  Reasons for the lethality of a weapon to be inconsistent, or expressed by percentage, can be as varied as minimized exposure to the weapon, previous exposure to the weapon minimizing susceptibility, degradation of the weapon over time and/or distance, and incorrect deployment of a multi-component weapon.

This term can also refer to the after-effects of weapon use, such as nuclear fallout, which has highest lethality nearest the deployment site, and in proportion to the subject's size and nature; e.g. a child or small animal.

Lethality can also refer to the after-effects of a chemical explosion.  A lethality curve can be developed for process safety reasons to protect people and equipment.  The impact is typically greatest closest to the explosion site and lessens to the outskirts of the impact zone.  Pressure, toxicity and location affect the lethality.

Lethality is also a term used by microbiologists and food scientists as a measure of the ability of a process to destroy bacteria. Lethality may be determined by enumeration of survivors after incremental exposures.

See also

Lethal dose, an indication of the lethal toxicity of a given substance or type of radiation
Stopping power
Toxicity

Military doctrines
Military terminology
Epidemiology
Rates
Death